Huntington 20 is a Bohairic-Greek, uncial manuscript of the New Testament, on paper. Palaeographically it has been assigned to the 13th century.

Description 
It contains the text of the four Gospels on 333 paper leaves (24.2 by 17.3). The text is written in 1 column per page, 24 lines per page. The manuscript omits the additions in Matthew 17:11; Luke 22:43.44 (the agony); John 5:3.4 (the descent of the angel); Pericope Adultera (7:53-8:11), but contains those of Matthew 23:13 (after verse 14); Luke 23:17.34.

The manuscript was examined by Lightfoot and Headlam. Horner used it in his edition of the Bohairic New Testament.

Currently it is housed at the Bodleian Library (Huntington 20) in Oxford.

See also 

 Coptic versions of the Bible
 Biblical manuscript
 Huntington MS 17
 British Library, Add MS 5995
 Oriental MS 425

References

Further reading 
 A. C. Headlam, Novum Testamentum

Coptic New Testament manuscripts
13th-century biblical manuscripts
Bodleian Library collection